Leonidas Rossi (born 19 April 1999) is a Greek professional footballer who plays as a left-back for Super League 2 club Kallithea.

References

1999 births
Living people
Greek footballers
Greece under-21 international footballers
Greece youth international footballers
Gamma Ethniki players
Super League Greece players
Super League Greece 2 players
Apollon Smyrnis F.C. players
Association football defenders
People from Sarandë